Emirates Gold is a precious metal refinery, bullion manufacturer, and dealer based in Dubai, United Arab Emirates. Working primarily with gold and silver, the company produces its own bullion (such as 995 and 999.9 purity kilobars) which is recognized internationally, as well as other products such as investment bars in sizes ranging from 1 gram to 100 grams, and customized coins and medals. Founded in 1992, it is one of the largest refineries in the Middle East.
Dubai is a very famous market for gold buying and selling and attract investors for making their profits.

References

Companies based in Dubai
1992 establishments in the United Arab Emirates
Bullion dealers
Metal companies of the United Arab Emirates